The Infant Jesus Cathedral is a historic Roman Catholic church established by Portuguese during 1614, situated at Tangasseri in the city of Quilon (Kollam), India. It is now the cathedral i.e the Seat of the Bishop of Roman Catholic Diocese of Quilon, the ancient and first catholic diocese of India. The Church remains as a memento of the Portuguese rule of old Quilon city.

History
The history of Infant Jesus Cathedral dates back to 1503 when Tangasseri came under the control of the Portuguese. The Portuguese who came to Quilon in 1503 led by Afonso de Albuquerque made Tangasseri a well fortified city by building a fort, which was called Fortaleza da São Tomé (known as St. Thomas Fort). Saint Francis Xavier established a church, a college(São Salvador College), a printing press(São Salvador seminary Press), and a religious study centre at Tangasseri during his visits in 1544 and 1549. In 1614, the Portuguese established the Infant Jesus church in its present location.

Later in 1661, Dutch gained control of Tangasseri and started deteriorating churches and other structures built by Portuguese. But in 1789, the Carmelites missionaries, who have arrived Quilon renovated this church and named it the Bom Jesu Church. In 1838 when Malabar Vicariate was erected with Verapoly as headquarters, Quilon was joined to it. Tangasseri retained its pivotal position in ecclesiastical parlance and became the base for Carmelite expeditions. Quilon vicariate was formed in 1845. Messenger Charles Hyacinth Valerga, pro-vicar Apostolic of Quilon died in Tangasseri on 24 December 1864 and was buried in the church. His successor Msgr. Maria Ephrem Carrelon was consecrated in Tangasseri in 1866.

Infant Jesus Church has been serving as the pro-cathedral of Kollam Diocese since 1886. Mortal remains of former Bishop of Quilon, Fr. Bishop Jerome M. Fernandez are also buried in the Infant Jesus Cathedral.

As the old Pro-Cathedral was ageing, a plan for a new building both beautiful and large to accommodate the increasing congregation was put forward. The old church was demolished and the foundation stone was laid by the then bishop Rev. Dr. Joseph G Fernandez in 2000 during the tenure of Monsingor Paul Mullassery. Later in the year 2001 Rev. Dr. Stanley Roman became the Bishop of Quilon and carried on with the construction. Rev. Msgr. George Mathew took charge as the parish priest in 2002, taking an active part in the completion of the church in the year 2005.

The new structure was completed at a cost of ₹04,56,00,000(US$845,000 in 2005) and was concentrated by Cardinal Telespher P Toppo (Archbishop of Ranchi), 
on 3 December 2005 and elevating the status of the church from pro-cathedral to a cathedral. The church is rich and beautiful, with mosaic paintings and glass paintings depicting various stages of Jesus's life. The biggest glass painting is that of the patroness of the Diocese of Quilon, Our Lady of Mount Carmel. A huge bell tower having 3 bells dating back 100 years is an adjacent structure to the cathedral along with a small shrine dedicated to Saint Joseph. A new modern parish house with guest house is built adjacent to the cathedral to accommodate the incoming guests as well as serving as the residence of the parish priest. A small chapel is located under the cathedral and is used for small prayer meetings and masses as well. In 2015, the bell tower was renovated and three new shrines dedicated to various saints of the Catholic world were concentrated. The saints whose statues are placed are Saint Anthony of Padua, Saint Sebastian, Saint Francis Xavier and blessed Devasahayam Pillai. In early 2016 one of the bells in the bell tower was made automated which was the first time in the whole diocese.

The holy mortal remains of Rev. Jerome .M. Fernandez, the first native Bishop of Quilon is buried in the prayer crypt below the Cathedral. Bishop Jerome .M. Fernandez was elevated to the status Servant of God by Pope Francis on 25 February 2019. The Elevation is the first of four steps to Sainthood. The Grand Celebration of the Elevation was celebrated by Holy Mass which was attended by many thousands of devotees along with all the bishops of Kerala and many dignitaries.

References

Churches in Kollam district
Colonial Kerala
Roman Catholic churches completed in 1614
17th-century Roman Catholic church buildings in India
1610s establishments in Portuguese India
Archaeological sites in Kerala
Portuguese in Kerala
Portuguese colonial architecture in India
1614 establishments in the Portuguese Empire
Roman Catholic cathedrals in Kerala
Church buildings with domes